Xestia agathina, the heath rustic, is a moth of the family Noctuidae. It is found in western and central Europe and Morocco.

Technical description and variation

The wingspan is 28–36 mm. Forewing greyish rufous; costal area paler for two-thirds, edged below at base by a fine dark streak; claviform stigma small and obscure; cell black brown; the two stigmata pale, orbicular variable, sometimes large, sometimes contracted to a white spot; hindwing dark grey; antennae of male serrate, with sessile fascicles of cilia. In the form hebridicola Stgr., from the Hebrides, the forewing becomes paler and loses the red tinge; in scopariae Mill, from France the red tinge is overpowered by black suffusion.

Biology
Adults are on wing from in September.

Larva green, with pale dark-edged lines, the spiracular broad and conspicuous. The larvae feed on Calluna species.

References

External links

 Funet
 Fauna Europaea
 UKmoths

Xestia
Moths of Europe
Moths of Africa
Moths described in 1790